James K. "Jay" Webber (born February 29, 1972) is an American Republican politician, who has served in the New Jersey General Assembly since January 8, 2008, where he represents the 26th legislative district. Webber has served in the Assembly as the Minority Appropriations Officer since 2018.

Early life and education
Webber was born in Teaneck, New Jersey. Raised in Clifton, he attended Saint Joseph Regional High School. He received a B.A. in International Studies from Johns Hopkins University, where he was Phi Beta Kappa and a Second Team All-American in baseball. He served as Budget Staffer and District Director to William J. Martini during his term in Congress. After leaving Congressman Martini's office, Webber was a staff member at the Manhattan Institute. Webber earned a J.D. from Harvard Law School and clerked for New Jersey Supreme Court justice Peter Verniero.

New Jersey Senate campaign 
At age 30 in 2003, Webber ran in the Republican primary against incumbent State Senator Robert Martin by running to the right of the senator. Martin defeated Webber by approximately 1,900 votes, 15 percentage points from the total vote.

New Jersey Assembly 
In 2007, following the retirement of Martin from the Senate and incumbent Assemblyman Joseph Pennacchio deciding to run for Martin's seat, Webber ran in the Republican primary for Pennacchio's Assembly seat. Incumbent Alex DeCroce took the most votes in the June primary (9,833 votes or 41.1%) while Webber advanced to the November general election by coming in second (7,679 votes, 32.2%) defeating Kinnelon councilman Larry Casha (6,369 votes, 26.7%). Webber was elected in the general election and has subsequently been re-elected every two years since then.

Committees 
Committee assignments for the current session are:
Appropriations
Financial Institutions and Insurance

District 26 
Each of the 40 districts in the New Jersey Legislature has one representative in the New Jersey Senate and two members in the New Jersey General Assembly. The representatives from the 26th District for the 2022—23 Legislative Session are:
Senator Joseph Pennacchio (R)
Assemblyman Christian Barranco (R)
Assemblyman Jay Webber (R)

New Jersey Republican Party chairmanship 
On June 11, 2009, Republican gubernatorial candidate Chris Christie announced his selection of Webber to succeed Tom Wilson as chairman of the New Jersey Republican State Committee. State Committee members unanimously supported the selection of Webber in a vote on June 17, 2009. Webber announced that he would be leaving the Chairman's post in January 2011, and was succeeded by Sam Raia.

2018 U.S. House campaign 
On February 3, 2018, Webber announced he would officially run for the U.S. House seat representing New Jersey's 11th congressional district, after incumbent Rodney Frelinghuysen announced on January 29 that he would not seek reelection. Webber received the Republican Party nomination in the June 6 primary election, defeating Anthony Ghee and Peter DeNeufville. He was defeated by Democratic nominee Mikie Sherrill in the November general election. Sherrill won 56.2% of the vote to Webber's 42.7%, defeating him by 13.5%, a 33 percentage-point shift in the vote share towards the Democrat compared to the last election. It was the largest partisan swing of any district in the 2018 House Elections.

Personal life 
He is married to Johanna, with whom he has eight children. He is a resident of Morris Plains. He owns a law firm based in Whippany.

Electoral history

New Jersey Assembly

United States House of Representatives

References

External links

 State legislative page
 
 Assemblyman Webber's legislative webpage, New Jersey Legislature
 New Jersey Legislature financial disclosure forms
2017 2016 2015 2014 2013 2012 2011 2010 2009 2008 2007

|-

1972 births
21st-century American politicians
Chairmen of the New Jersey Republican State Committee
Harvard Law School alumni
Johns Hopkins University alumni
Living people
New Jersey lawyers
Republican Party members of the New Jersey General Assembly
People from Morris Plains, New Jersey
People from Teaneck, New Jersey
Politicians from Clifton, New Jersey
Saint Joseph Regional High School alumni
Candidates in the 2018 United States elections